Tudor City is an apartment complex located on the southern edge of Turtle Bay on the East Side of Manhattan in New York City, near Turtle Bay's border with Murray Hill. It lies on a low cliff, which is east of Second Avenue between 40th and 43rd Streets and overlooks First Avenue. Construction commenced in 1926, making it the first residential skyscraper complex in the world.

Tudor City was one of the first, largest, and most important examples of a planned middle-class residential community in New York City. It is named for its Tudor Revival architecture.

Background 

Prospect Hill rises eastward from Second Avenue to a granite cliff about 40 feet above First Avenue. Forty-first and 43rd Streets do not reach First Avenue but end at a three-block-long north–south street called Tudor City Place, which crosses 42nd Street on an overpass. The topography provides a measure of seclusion.

The area was first developed following the Civil War when the streets between First and Second Avenues were largely built up with brownstone-fronted row houses erected for the middle class. Development of single-family houses in the Tudor City area peaked in 1870. Elevated railway lines were erected on Second and Third Avenues in the late 1870s, and soon afterward the blocks east of First Avenue were taken over by noxious industries: abattoirs and meat packing houses, a gasworks, and a glue factory.

Middle-class families abandoned their row houses, which were converted into rooming houses or replaced by tenements. Prospect Hill became a multi-ethnic slum. At the same time, as a result of the increasing shortage of servants and the growth of the automobile industry, Manhattan's middle and upper classes began to flee to the suburbs. Many workers then commuted by train to the new Grand Central Terminal and the office buildings which sprang up around it.

A real estate operator named Leonard Gans believed there was a market for middle-class apartments within walking distance of the terminal, and that Prospect Hill was an advantageous location for it. He persuaded Paine Edson, a long-time employee of The Fred F. French Company, successful developers of both office and residential buildings, who convinced Fred French himself. With Gans's help, the company quickly acquired nearly a hundred properties. On December 18, 1925, French announced plans for a large residential development on Prospect Hill to serve that market – in Dolkart's words, "a complex of apartment houses and residence hotels that would be so convenient, well-planned, well-built, and well-priced that middle-class families and single people would be more attracted to these Manhattan buildings than to houses or apartments in the outer boroughs or the suburbs."

Layout and parks 
Tudor City was designed as a series of apartment buildings that surround two blockfront-long shared parks. With its buildings arranged roughly in a U-shape open to the west – the tall Windsor, Tudor, and Prospect Towers along the eastern edge and the parks at its center – the complex turned its back on the noisome industrial area then located to the east and created a clearly identifiable neighborhood distinct from the grid around it.

The parks were not part of French's original scheme. In 1926 the company wrote, "after the buildings on 43rd Street and 41st Street and [Prospect and Tudor Towers] have been fully rented, these parks will be developed into possible forty-story hotels." But French soon changed his mind and by early 1927 made the parks a key part of the development's advertising campaign.

The North Park was designed by landscape architect Sheffield A. Arnold and laid out during the summer of 1927. A tree-moving machine was used to transplant full-grown trees to the site. The grass, shrubbery, flower beds, and Norway maples and spruce trees were tended by a uniformed and well-trained crew. The park had graveled walks, two timber structures – a pitched-roofed lychgate and a pergola – wooden benches, decorative iron lamp posts, and a central fountain, and was surrounded by a simple iron fence. In contrast, the South Park became a miniature golf course equipped with traps, a water hazard, nighttime illumination, and a professional golfer as an instructor. In 1930 a new course was opened across 41st Street, and the South Park was remade in the style of the North Park. Both parks have since been substantially narrowed and re-landscaped.

Tudor Revival style 
From the beginning, the project was referred to as Tudor City, referring to its style of architectural ornament. Known as Tudor Revival, the style mixed the 16th-century English forms Tudor and Elizabethan. In early 20th-century America, these architectural motifs had come to symbolize the comforts of suburban living. Tudor City was conceived as an urban response to the suburban flight of the middle class, and therefore was designed with the architectural forms expected in a suburban development. By the time of Tudor City, the Neo-Tudor style had already been used on a limited number of urban apartment buildings, including Hudson View Gardens in Washington Heights (New York City) and several erected by the Fred F. French Company.

The architects and designers of Tudor City, led by chief architect H. Douglas Ives, used a broad range of Tudor Revival details, including towers, gables, parapets, balustrades, chimney stacks, oriels, bay windows, four-centred arches, pinnacles, quatrefoils, fish bladder moldings, Tudor roses, portcullises (a symbol of the Tudor sovereigns), and rampant lions carrying standards. Much of the Tudor effect in Tudor City is gained through the use of carved or cast stone and terracotta detail. The Tudor skyline of the complex is complemented at ground level by a series of stained glass windows ranging from those with lightly tinted non-figural designs to scenes depicting the history of New York.

The wooden entrance doors are carved with such Tudor forms as linenfold panels and fish-bladder tracery, and decorated with hardware based on sixteenth-century precedents. Public lobbies include half-timbering, carved woodwork, beamed ceilings, arched openings, plaster friezes and rosettes, and Tudor-style fixtures and furnishings. Although the buildings are unified by the consistent use of Tudor detail, there is a significant amount of variety since no two buildings have the same decoration. The stone, terracotta, woodwork, ironwork, and glass used were of the highest quality.

United Nations 

In 1948, the industry on the east side of First Avenue was displaced by construction of the new headquarters for the United Nations, which took four years. In conjunction, both 42nd Street and Tudor City Place were widened, which narrowed the Tudor City parks in both directions, east–west and north–south.

Before that, 42nd Street traffic had reached First Avenue via a 40-foot-wide cut through Prospect Hill. On both sides of 42nd Street 30-foot wide roadways climbed the hill, connecting it with Tudor City Place above, which crossed 42nd Street on a masonry overpass. (At  in length, the overpass formed a tunnel over the cut.) Both inclined roadways were lined with buildings.

The reconstruction leveled the side roadways, giving 42nd Street its full 100-foot width and eliminating the overpass, which was replaced by the present Tudor City bridge in 1952. The Hotel Tudor, Church of the Covenant, and Woodstock entrances were left five, eleven, and seventeen feet above the new grade, respectively. All three sued the city, received cash awards, and made the necessary architectural changes to lower their entrances. Rows of houses near the top of the hill on both sides had to be sacrificed, and in the 1960s the city replaced them with public parks, adjacent to the private ones.

No. 2 Tudor City Place 
The last Tudor City building was erected 25 years after the rest of the complex was completed. By 1930, the French Company had acquired all the land on the west side of Tudor City Place (then called Prospect Place) between 40th and 41st Streets half-way to Second Avenue, except for the row house at No. 8, whose owner refused to sell. The company cleared the rest of the plot and built there first a miniature golf course, moved from its original spot in the South Park on the north side of 41st Street, and then, opening in May 1933 and remaining some 20 years, tennis courts (on which Pancho Segura, Bobby Riggs, Bill Tilden, Rudy Vallée, and Katharine Hepburn played exhibition matches).

One winter, the courts were flooded to create an ice-skating rink. After the company finally purchased No. 8 in 1945, it waited another decade before building the 14-story, 333-apartment building at No. 2 Tudor City Place, which opened in 1956, lacking the Tudor-style ornament of all the other buildings except the Hotel Tudor.

Helmsley 

The French Company sold the Hotel Tudor in 1963. It has changed management several times and is today known as Westgate New York Grand Central. The other buildings, except No. 2 Tudor City Place, were purchased in October 1970 by Harry Helmsley, who also bought the parks, announcing his plan to replace them with two luxury apartment buildings. Community opposition was intense, backed by the press. A number of alternatives were suggested, such as transferal of the parks' air rights to a nearby property – now commonplace, but then novel – but for various reasons, none was feasible. The controversy continued for years.

All the apartments were subject to rent laws, which barred any reduction in required services. In October 1984 a state court ruled that the parks were required services, which ended the matter. The battle, however, had led to a preservation campaign. On December 10, 1985, the New York City Landmarks Preservation Commission held a public hearing on the proposed designation of a Tudor City Historic District. On September 11, 1986, Tudor City was added to the National Register of Historic Places as a historic district, and the city historic district was officially designated on May 17, 1988.

By May 1985, Harry Helmsley sold the buildings to Philip Pilevsky of Philips International and Francis J. Greenburger of Time Equities. The Hermitage was sold first, in 1983, subsequently changed hands several times, and has remained a rental building, but Pilevsky and Greenburger converted the other buildings into co-op apartments, as was happening across the city. In the co-op conversion the gardens were spun off to The Trust for Public Land, a national conservancy organization. Tudor City Greens, Inc. was formed in January 1987 for the purpose of assuming ownership of the parks, and granted an easement to the trust that prohibits construction and bans unacceptable behavior. Greenburger and Pilevsky dedicated a fund of $820,000 to benefit the parks. (No. 2 Tudor City Place was converted by others in 1984.)

When the real estate market and economy slowed between 1989 and 1994, some co-op prices dropped significantly, as owners and investors were concerned that the co-ops themselves would become insolvent. In April 2008, New York magazine recalled the 1989 slump:

Buildings 

Tudor City's 13 buildings, comprising 11 co-op apartment buildings, one all-rental building (The Hermitage), and a transient hotel, are home to 5000 residents. The complex includes several shops and restaurants.

The three large towers on Tudor City Place (Prospect Tower, Tudor Tower, and Windsor Tower), Woodstock Tower, and Hatfield House were built as apartment hotels – legally permitted to be taller than conventional apartment houses – most of whose units, including many single rooms called "efficiency" studios, had Murphy beds and serving pantries but no stoves. They were marketed to single people and childless couples, young people who in the past would have lived in brownstone boardinghouses, and as pieds-à-terre for businesspeople and professionals who, rather than commuting daily, would spend one or two nights in town each week.

At one time these efficiencies developed a reputation as "love nests" for mistresses and prostitutes. As co-ops, some have been combined into larger apartments. These buildings also included a few apartments with full kitchens, and penthouses with roof terraces. The Manor, The Hermitage, The Cloister, Essex House, Haddon Hall, and Hardwicke Hall were all built as traditional apartment buildings with units ranging in size from studios to six rooms.

Tudor City's original shops included three restaurants (providing room service for a fee), grocery, liquor, and drug stores, barber shop, and beauty parlor. Services included a post office, indoor playground, private nursery, maids, laundry and valet service, private guards, garage, a furniture repair and rug cleaning service, and a radio engineer who would repair and connect aerials.

The New York City historic district includes six buildings which predate Tudor City: the Church of the Covenant at 310 East 42nd Street, the Prospect Hill Apartments at 333 East 41st Street, and four brownstones, typical of the dozens on the site before Tudor City, at 337 East 41st Street and 336–340 East 43rd Street. Also included are the two private parks (open to the public 7:00am–10:pm daily) and the two city-owned parks. The U.S. historic district is the same except it excludes No. 2 Tudor City Place and the two city-owned parks.

The sign 
The Fred F. French Company advertised Tudor City heavily from its initial announcement until 1943. Included in the early campaign were two rooftop signs composed of incandescent light bulbs, one on either side of 42nd Street – on the north roof of Tudor Tower and the south roof of Prospect Tower – that could be seen from blocks away. The former was obscured by The Woodstock, and was removed  1933. The latter was retrofitted with neon in 1939; after falling in a storm in September 1949, it was replaced by a new version. This replacement, having lost its lighting tube years ago, is now a neglected rusting iron shell. In 1995, the co-op board of Prospect Tower requested permission from the Landmarks Preservation Commission to remove it, calling it ugly and dangerous, but the commission refused, on the ground of historical significance. As of 2020, the signs' steel support structure and pan letters have undergone a complete restoration but plans to re-illuminate the sign have not materialized.

The sign and its supporting structure have been used many times as a setting for movies, TV, fashion magazines, and commercials.

In popular culture 

Film

{{columns-list|colwidth=30em|
 The Most Wanted Man (1953)
 Two Men in Manhattan (1959)
 Ciao! Manhattan (1972)
 Taxi Driver (1976)
 Superman (1978)
 Can't Stop the Music (1980)
 Scarface (1983)
 Splash (1984)
 The Godfather Part III (1990)
 Bullets over Broadway (1994)<ref>Barbanel, Josh. "Selling a Tudor City Treasure", The Wall Street Journal, March 18, 2012</ref>
 The Peacemaker (1997)
 A Perfect Murder (1998)
 U.S. Marshals (1998)
 The Caveman's Valentine (2001)
 Spider-Man (2002), Spider-Man 2 (2004), Spider-Man 3 (2007)
 The Bourne Ultimatum (2007)
 The International (2009)
 Here and Now (2018)

}}

Television

Fashion and advertising

Record album
 Tudor City'' by New York Polyphony (released in 2010)

References 
Notes

Source
Tudor City Confidential, a picture blog

Citations

External links 

Images:
 New York Architecture
 New York Public Library Digital Collections
 Museum of the City of New York Collections Portal
 Library of Congress
 Getty Images
 Scale model: 

Neighborhoods in Manhattan
Condominiums and housing cooperatives in Manhattan
Residential skyscrapers in Manhattan
Midtown Manhattan
Multi-building developments in New York City
Tudor Revival architecture in New York City
New York City Designated Landmarks in Manhattan
New York City designated historic districts
Historic districts on the National Register of Historic Places in Manhattan